Elachista gerasimovi is a moth of the family Elachistidae that is endemic to Uzbekistan.

The forewings are dark brown with a bronze lustre and golden shining marks. The hindwings are greyish brown, but paler in the basal part.

Etymology
This species is named in honour of Russian entomologist A.M. Gerasimov who has collected the holotype.

References

gerasimovi
Moths described in 2000
Endemic fauna of Uzbekistan
Moths of Asia